Luis Fernando Copete Murillo (born 12 February 1989) is a professional footballer who plays as a centre back for Liga Primera club Diriangén.

Born in Colombia, he is a member, as a naturalised citizen, of the Nicaragua national team.

Club career

Puma Generaleña
In 2015, Copete and his then Nicaragua national team mate Raúl Leguías joined Costa Rican side AS Puma.

Copete went on trial with Kazakhstan Premier League side FC Shakhter Karagandy in early 2016, but did not earn a contract.

Sonsonate
Copete signed with top flight Primera División side Sonsonate for Clausura 2018 tournament.

On 29 March 2018, Copete scored his debut goal for Sonsonate in a 3–1 victory against Isidro Metapán in the Estadio Anna Mercedes Campos.

Deportivo Pasto
In July 2018, Copete signed with Deportivo Pasto.

International career
Copete became a naturalized citizen of Nicaragua in 2014, and received his first call-up to the Nicaragua national football team a year later.

He was a squad member for the 2017 Copa Centroamericana and the 2017 CONCACAF Gold Cup.

International goals

Scores and results list the Nicaragua's goal tally first.

References

External links
 
 
 
 

1989 births
Living people
Sportspeople from Chocó Department
Nicaraguan men's footballers
Nicaragua international footballers
Colombian footballers
Nicaraguan people of Colombian descent
Colombian emigrants to Nicaragua
Association football central defenders
Categoría Primera A players
La Equidad footballers
Deportivo Pasto footballers
Liga FPD players
Peruvian Primera División players
Comerciantes Unidos footballers
Salvadoran Primera División players
C.D. Sonsonate footballers
Bolivian Primera División players
Club Always Ready players
Colombian expatriate footballers
Colombian expatriate sportspeople in Costa Rica
Expatriate footballers in Costa Rica
Colombian expatriate sportspeople in Peru
Expatriate footballers in Peru
Colombian expatriate sportspeople in El Salvador
Expatriate footballers in El Salvador
Colombian expatriate sportspeople in Bolivia
Expatriate footballers in Bolivia
Naturalized citizens of Nicaragua
2014 Copa Centroamericana players
2017 Copa Centroamericana players
2017 CONCACAF Gold Cup players
2019 CONCACAF Gold Cup players
Nicaraguan Primera División players
C.D. Walter Ferretti players
Real Estelí F.C. players